Frank A. Dwinell (May 23, 1848 – December 3, 1928) was a Vermont businessman and politician who served as President of the Vermont State Senate.

Biography
Dwinell was born in East Calais, Vermont on May 23, 1848.  He completed his education at Barre Academy, and began a business career in his father's East Calais store in 1868.  In 1874 Dwinell moved to Plainfield, where operated his own store.

In 1885 Dwinell was an original incorporator of the Vermont office of the Farmers' Trust Company, and was chosen its President.  In 1890 he relocated to Montpelier.  Dwinell's other business interests included serving as a member of the board of directors for Montpelier's Wetmore & Morse Granite Company and First National Bank, and a Vice President of the Montpelier Building & Construction Company.

A Republican, Dwinell held several local offices in Plainfield, including Town Clerk and Treasurer.  In 1878 he was elected to represent Plainfield in the Vermont House of Representatives.  In 1890 he was elected to the Vermont Senate, and was chosen its President.

In 1898 Dwinell became a Loan Inspector for Montpelier's National Life Insurance Company. He later became Supervisor of the company's farm loans, a position in which he served until his death.

Dwinell died in Montpelier on December 3, 1928.

References 

1848 births
1928 deaths
People from Montpelier, Vermont
People from Calais, Vermont
Republican Party members of the Vermont House of Representatives
Republican Party Vermont state senators
Presidents pro tempore of the Vermont Senate